Chionodes meddix is a moth in the family Gelechiidae. It is found in North America, where it has been recorded from Texas, Arizona and California.

References

Chionodes
Moths described in 1999
Moths of North America